Eriogonum thomasii is a species of wild buckwheat known by the common name Thurber's buckwheat. It is native to the desert southwest of North America in Arizona, California, New Mexico and three desert states of Mexico, where it is common to abundant in many areas.

Description
It is a thin annual herb growing up to 40 centimeters tall, with a basal rosette of rounded to oval leaves around the stem.

The inflorescence is an open array of stem branches bearing clusters of tiny white to pink flowers.

References

External links
Jepson Manual Treatment
Photo gallery

thurberi
Flora of California
Flora of Arizona
Flora of New Mexico
Flora of Baja California
Flora of Baja California Sur
Flora of Sonora
Flora of the California desert regions
Flora of the Sonoran Deserts
Natural history of the California chaparral and woodlands
Natural history of the Colorado Desert
Natural history of the Mojave Desert
Natural history of the Peninsular Ranges
Plants described in 1859
Flora without expected TNC conservation status